Dam was a small coin, either silver, gold or copper first minted during between c. 1098 - 1126 CE., replacing old Licchavi coinage.

History
First introduced by King Sivadeva during his between c. 1098 and 1126 CE., replacing old Lichhavi coinage. In the new system Gold Sivaka, Silver Dam and later Nava-Dam-Sivaka and copper Dam were introduced as a new denomination.

Types
Originally Nepali Dam, were made of 1 g pure silver or copper, but Later minting of copper Dam was discontinued in the Malla period and dam started getting smaller and smaller up-to 0.04 g. Copper Dams were reintroduced during Shah era but was only used in other Hill and Terai region of Nepal as tiny silver dams were preferred by the locals of  Kathmandu Valley.

In popular culture
Watch Your Language lists the coin as one of the possible sources for the English phrase "I don't give a dam[n]″, due to its small worth, but provides other sources as well.

Gallery

See also

Nepalese mohar
Coinage of Nepal

References 

Modern obsolete currencies
Currencies of Nepal
Sur Empire
Coins